This is a list of gliders/sailplanes of the world, (this reference lists most gliders with references, where available) 
Note: Any aircraft can glide for a short time, but gliders are designed to glide for longer.

J

Jach
(Franciszek Jach)
 Jach Bimbuś (Bimbo) No.3 – Second Polish Glider Contest 17 May – 15 June 1925
 Jach Żabuś (Froggy) – First Polish Glider Contest August 1923 
 Jach Żabuś 2 (Froggy 2) No.4 – Second Polish Glider Contest 17 May – 15 June 1925

Janka
(Zoltán Janka)
 Janka Gyöngyös 33
 Janka Kócsag
 Janka-Rotter Vándor (Zoltán Janka – Lajos Rotter / MOVERO workshop, Gyöngyös)

Jansson-Thor
(Bengt Jansson & Hank Thor)
 Jansson-Thor BJ-1B Duster
 Jansson-Thor BJ-1 Dyna Mite

Japanese Imperial Army Gliders
 Ku-5
 Ku-9
 Ku-10
 Ku-12
 Ku-14

Janowski
(Jaroslaw Janowski)
 Janowsky J-5 Marco – 
 Janowsky J-6 Fregata

Jasiński-Czarnecki Czajka
(Jasiński & Czarnecki)
 Jasiński & Czarnecki Czajka (Lapwing) No.15 – Second Polish Glider Contest 17 May – 15 June 1925

Jastreb 
(Jastreb Fabrika Aviona i Jedrilica – Jastreb Aeroplane and Glider Factory)
 Jastreb Cirrus 17-VTC
 Jastreb Cirrus 75-VTC
 Jastreb Cirrus G/81
 Jastreb Kosava-2-S
 Jastreb Vuk-T (Tomislav Dragović)
 Jastreb Šole 77

Jaworski
(Wiktor Jaworski)
 Jaworski WJ 3

Jefferson
(G. Jefferson)
 Jefferson 1933 glider

Jelgava
 Jelgava I
 Jelgava-Hütter 17

Jensen
(Volmer S. Jensen, Burbank, CA)
 Martin M-1
 Volmer J-14
 Jensen VJ-11
 Jensen VJ-21
Volmer VJ-22 Sportsman
 Volmer VJ-23 Swingwing
 Volmer VJ-24W SunFun

Jobagy
(John Jobagy)
 Jobagy Bagyjo

Johnson
(Dick Johnson)
 Johnson RHJ-6 Adastra

Joly
(Édouard Joly)
 Joly Motoplaneur
 Joly CAB 44

Jongblood
(Mike Jongblood)
 Jongblood Primary

Jonker
(Jonker Sailplanes  / Attie Jonker)
 Jonker JS-1 Revelation
 Jonker JG-1
 Jonker JS-3 Rapture

Jubi
(Jubi Sportflugzeugbau GmbH)
 Jubi K-13

Junkers
(Junkers Flugzeug-Werke A.G.)
 Junkers Ju 322 Mammut – Mammoth

Notes

Further reading

External links

Lists of glider aircraft